Bernardo de' Rossi (26 August 1468 – 28 June 1527) was an Italian bishop and patron of the arts.

Biography
Rossi was the son of a feudal family of the area of Parma, at a young age he received the archdeaconate  of Padua and the Abbey of St. Crisogonus in Zadar. On 4 Apr 1487, thanks to the support of the Republic of Venice, he was appointed Bishop of Belluno. On 16 Aug 1499, he was appointed as bishop of Treviso. Here he held a small court, featuring artists such as  Lorenzo Lotto, who painted a portrait of him around 1505.

In 1503, de' Rossi entered into conflict with the Venetian podestà of Treviso, Girolamo Contarini. In September of that year a plot set against him by the Onigo family failed as it was discovered before its application.

In 1509, after further controversies with the Venetian authorities, he was forced to leave the diocese, and moved to Rome (1510). In 1522 he returned to the ancestral field of San Secondo Parmense, fighting against members of his family. He eventually clashed against the condottiero Giovanni dalle Bande Nere, who had come to help his sister-in-law Bianca Riario, the wife of Troilo I de' Rossi. Bernardo de' Rossi fled to Parma in 1524, and died a few years later, perhaps poisoned by his nephews Giovan Girlamo and Bertrando.

While bishop, he was the principal consecrator of Paride de Grassis, Bishop of Pesaro (1513).

References

External links and additional sources
Page on Bernardo de' Rossi 
 (for Chronology of Bishops) 
 (for Chronology of Bishops)  
  (for Chronology of Bishops) 
  (for Chronology of Bishops) 

1468 births
1527 deaths
Bishops of Belluno
Bishops of Treviso
16th-century Roman Catholic bishops in the Republic of Venice